Still More! Sing Along with Mitch is an album by Mitch Miller & The Gang. It was released in 1959 on the Columbia label (catalog no. CL-1283).

The album debuted on Billboard magazine's popular albums chart on March 23, 1959, peaked at No. 4, and remained on that chart for 71 weeks. It was certified as a gold record by the RIAA.

Track listing
Side 1
 "In a Shanty in Old Shanty Town"
 "Smile"
 "I'll Be with You in Apple Blossom Time"
 "Memories"
 "When Day Is Gone"
 "Good Night Sweetheart"

Side 2
 "Tiptoe Through the Tulips with Me"
 Medley: "A Bicycle Built for Two"; "Put on Your Old Grey Bonnet", and "I'm Just Wild About Mary (I'm Just Wild About Harry)"
 Medley: "The Band Played On" and "Oh! You Beautiful Doll"
 Medley: "Hinky Dinky Parlez-Vous" and "She'll Be Coming 'Round the Mountain"
 "Beer Barrel Polka"
 Medley: "When You Were Sweet Sixteen" and "Silver Threads Among the Gold"

References

1959 albums
Columbia Records albums
Mitch Miller albums